DeKalb County Courthouse is a historic courthouse located in Maysville, DeKalb County, Missouri. It was designed by George R. Eckel and built in 1939. It is a low red brick building with concrete bands and Moderne style details. It consists of a three-story main block with two-story flanking wings. The building measures 110 feet by 55 feet.

It was listed on the National Register of Historic Places in 1998.

References

County courthouses in Missouri
Courthouses on the National Register of Historic Places in Missouri
Modernist architecture in Missouri
Government buildings completed in 1939
Buildings and structures in DeKalb County, Missouri
National Register of Historic Places in DeKalb County, Missouri